Prasophyllum spadiceum, commonly known as the brown lip leek orchid, is a species of orchid endemic to southern continental Australia. It has a single tube-shaped leaf and up to thirty pale green, brown and white flowers with a whitish labellum. It is a recently described plant, previously included with P. fitzgeraldii, but distinguished from that species by its smaller, paler flowers, whitish labellum and brown callus. It grows in the south-east of South Australia and in a single location in western Victoria.

Description
As with others in the genus, the flowers are inverted so that the labellum is above the column rather than below it. The upturned part is wavy or crinkled on the edges. There is a lance-shaped to egg-shaped, coffee-coloured callus in the centre of the labellum and extending almost to its tip. Flowering occurs in October.

Taxonomy and naming
Prasophyllum spadiceum was first formally described in 2017 by David Jones and Robert Bates and the description was published in Australian Orchid Review from a specimen collected in the Gum Lagoon Conservation Park. The specific epithet (spadiceum) is a Latin word meaning "reddish-brown", referring to the colour of the callus.

Distribution and habitat
The brown lip leek orchid mostly grows in damp heathy woodland and is found in the mid south-east of South Australia and in a single location with about 100 plants near Apsley in far western Victoria.

References

External links 
 

spadiceum
Flora of South Australia
Flora of Victoria (Australia)
Plants described in 2017
Endemic orchids of Australia